Dirk Arthur Kempthorne (born October 29, 1951) is an American politician who served as the 49th United States Secretary of the Interior from 2006 to 2009 under President George W. Bush. A member of the Republican Party, he previously served as a United States Senator from Idaho from 1993 to 1999 and the 30th governor of Idaho from 1999 to 2006.

Kempthorne was first elected to public office as Mayor of Boise in 1985, where he served for seven years. He serves as a co-chair of the Democracy Project at the Bipartisan Policy Center. In November 2010, he was appointed president and CEO of the American Council of Life Insurers.

Early life, education and early career
Kempthorne was raised in San Bernardino, California. He attended and graduated from San Gorgonio High School in San Bernardino, attended San Bernardino Valley College, then transferred north to the University of Idaho in Moscow, where he graduated in 1975 with a degree in political science, and served a term as student body president. Upon graduation Kempthorne served as an assistant to the director of the Idaho Department of Lands and then as executive vice president of the Idaho Home Builders Association.

In 1982, Kempthorne managed the gubernatorial campaign for Lieutenant Governor Phil Batt, who lost to the incumbent Democrat, Governor John V. Evans. In 1983 Kempthorne became state public affairs manager for FMC Corporation.

Kempthorne and his wife, Patricia Kempthorne, also a UI graduate, have two adult children, Heather and Jeff.

Kempthorne is of Cornish ancestry.

Political career

Mayor of Boise
Kempthorne's first major political victory came at age 34, when he was elected mayor of Boise in 1985. As mayor, Kempthorne became very popular and was unopposed for reelection in 1989.

U.S. Senate 

In 1992, U.S. Senator Steve Symms decided not to seek a third term and Kempthorne pursued the Republican nomination for the seat. In the general election, Kempthorne defeated Democratic U.S. Representative Richard H. Stallings.

In the Senate, Kempthorne sponsored and helped pass the Unfunded Mandates Reform Act of 1995, a bill meant to prohibit Congress from imposing unfunded federal mandates on states. The bill aimed to:

[C]urb the practice of imposing unfunded Federal mandates on States and local governments; to strengthen the partnership between the Federal Government and State, local and tribal governments; to end the imposition, in the absence of full consideration by Congress, of Federal mandates on State, local, and tribal governments without adequate funding, in a manner that may displace other essential governmental priorities; and to ensure that the Federal Government pays the costs incurred by those governments in complying with certain requirements under Federal statutes and regulations, and for other purposes.

Also in 1995, Senator Kempthorne introduced amendments to the Safe Drinking Water Act. This bill was signed into law by President Clinton on August 6, 1996.

During his six years in the Senate, Kempthorne scored a "0" on the League of Conservation Voters' legislative scorecards every year except 1993, when he scored 6 percent on the basis of one vote against funding a rocket booster for the space program that environmentalists judged harmful to the environment. His overall LCV score for that period was less than 1%.

Source:

Governor of Idaho
Kempthorne was expected to run for reelection in 1998, but instead decided to run for the open seat for governor. The incumbent, Phil Batt, shocked the state by announcing his retirement after only one term in office, citing his age (71) as the prime factor in his decision. Kempthorne's Senate seat would be won by Republican congressman Mike Crapo of Idaho Falls.

Kempthorne won the gubernatorial election in a landslide, receiving 68 percent of the vote while his Democratic opponent, Robert C. Huntley, received only 29 percent. He was reelected in 2002 with 56 percent of the vote, compared to his Democratic opponent, Jerry Brady, who polled 42 percent. Kempthorne's campaign spent nearly $200,000 more than it had received in contributions prior to the election; he spent the next two years raising funds to pay off the campaign debt.

U.S. Secretary of the Interior

On March 16, 2006, Kempthorne was nominated by President George W. Bush to replace Gale Norton as the 49th Secretary of the Interior. On May 10, 2006, Kempthorne's nomination was approved by voice vote by the United States Senate Committee on Energy and Natural Resources. He was confirmed by the full Senate on May 26 and resigned as Idaho Governor to accept the position the same day. Lieutenant Governor Jim Risch succeeded Kempthorne as Idaho Governor, filling out the remaining months of his term. Kempthorne is the second Idahoan to hold the Cabinet post. Former Governor Cecil Andrus was the Secretary of the Interior under President Jimmy Carter, serving from 1977 to 1981.

Upon Kempthorne's appointment as Secretary of the Interior, environmental groups characterized him as someone who has "almost always favored changing laws like the Endangered Species Act and the Safe Drinking Water Act to make them more favorable to commercial interests."

As Secretary of the Interior, Kempthorne was criticized for not placing any plants or animals on the federal endangered species list since his confirmation on May 26, 2006. As of September 2007, Kempthorne held the record for protecting fewer species over his tenure than any Interior Secretary in United States history, a record previously held by James G. Watt for over 20 years.

In December 2007, as a result of a long-term investigation and resignation of former Deputy Assistant Secretary Julie MacDonald, Inspector General Earl Devaney found "abrupt and abrasive, if not abusive" management at the department under Kempthorne's supervision. U.S. Senator Ron Wyden, chairman of the Senate Subcommittee on Public Lands and Forests, attributed the "untold waste of hundreds of thousands of taxpayers' dollars" to MacDonald's actions. Of the department, Representative Nick J. Rahall II, chairman of the House Natural Resources said "The results of this investigation paint a picture of something akin to a secret society residing within the Interior Department that was colluding to undermine the protection of endangered wildlife and covering for one another's misdeeds."

In September 2008, Devaney reported wrongdoing by current and former employees of the Minerals Management Service, an agency under Kempthorne's administration that collects about $10 billion in oil and gas royalties annually, and one of the government's largest sources of revenue other than taxes. According to The New York Times, "Eight officials in the royalty program accepted gifts from energy companies whose value exceeded limits set by ethics rules—including golf, ski and paintball outings; meals and drinks; and tickets to a Toby Keith concert, a Houston Texans football game and a Colorado Rockies baseball game ... The investigation also concluded that several of the officials "frequently consumed alcohol at industry functions, had used cocaine and marijuana, and had sexual relationships with oil and gas company representatives." The New York Times reports a whistleblower had officially complained about the wrongdoings in the spring of 2006, prior to Kempthorne's being sworn into the office.

On December 16, 2008, the Center for Biological Diversity announced intent to sue the Interior Department under Kempthorne for introducing "regulations ... that would eviscerate our nation's most successful wildlife law by exempting thousands of federal activities, including those that generate greenhouse gases, from review under the Endangered Species Act." The lawsuit, which is critical of policy advocated by Kempthorne and President George W. Bush, was filed in the Northern District of California by the CBD, Greenpeace and Defenders of Wildlife. According to the CBD, "The lawsuit argues that the regulations violate the Endangered Species Act and did not go through the required public review process. The regulations, first proposed on August 11th, were rushed by the Bush administration through an abbreviated process in which more than 300,000 comments from the public were reviewed in 2-3 weeks, and environmental impacts were analyzed in a short and cursory environmental assessment, rather than a fuller environmental impact statement."

In 2009, CNN correspondent Campbell Brown criticized Kempthorne for using "$235,000 of [taxpayer] money to renovate his office bathroom at the Department of Interior." According to Brown, the costs included a shower, a refrigerator, and a freezer hidden behind lavish wood paneling, as well as "DK" monogrammed towels. Donald Swain, Chief of the Interior Department's National Business Center said the towels do not exist. He further says the project came in $10,000 under budget and was approved by the General Services Administration.

See also

References

External links

 

|-

|-

|-

|-

|-

|-

|-

1951 births
20th-century American politicians
21st-century American politicians
Methodists from Idaho
American people of Cornish descent
George W. Bush administration cabinet members
Republican Party governors of Idaho
Living people
Mayors of Boise, Idaho
People from Boise, Idaho
Politicians from San Bernardino, California
Politicians from San Diego
Republican Party United States senators from Idaho
United States Secretaries of the Interior
University of Idaho alumni
San Bernardino Valley College alumni
Members of Congress who became lobbyists